This is a list of diplomatic missions of Uzbekistan. The landlocked Central Asian state straddles an interesting political divide within the spheres of influence of Russia, China and the Islamic world.  Simultaneously Uzbekistan seeks its economic and political fortunes by forging ties with both the United States and the European Union, notwithstanding criticism of the country's poor human rights record.  The country's diplomatic network reflects these competing priorities.

Africa

 Cairo (Embassy)

America

 Washington, D.C. (Embassy)
 New York (Consulate General)

Asia

 Kabul (Embassy)
 Mazar-i-Sharif (Consulate)

 Baku (Embassy)

 Beijing (Embassy)
 Guangzhou (Consulate-General) 
 Shanghai (Consulate-General)

 New Delhi (Embassy)

 Jakarta (Embassy)

 Tehran (Embassy)

 Tel Aviv (Embassy)

 Tokyo (Embassy)

 Astana (Embassy)
 Aktau (Consulate-General) 
 Almaty (Consulate-General) 

 Kuwait City (Embassy)

 Bishkek (Embassy)

 Kuala Lumpur (Embassy)

 Muscat (Embassy)

 Islamabad (Embassy)

 Riyadh (Embassy)
 Jeddah (Consulate General)

Singapore (Embassy)

 Seoul (Embassy)

 Dushanbe (Embassy)

 Bangkok (Consulate General)

 Ankara (Embassy)
 Istanbul (Consulate General)

 Ashgabat (Embassy)

 Abu Dhabi (Embassy)
 Dubai (Consulate General)

Europe
 
 Vienna (Embassy)

 Minsk (Embassy)
  
 Brussels (Embassy)

 Paris (Embassy)
 
 Berlin (Embassy)
 Frankfurt (Consulate-General)
 
 Athens (Consulate-General)

 Rome (Embassy)

 Riga (Embassy)

 Warsaw (Embassy)

 Moscow (Embassy)
 Saint Petersburg (Consulate-General) 
 Novosibirsk (Consulate-General)
 Kazan (Consulate-General) 
 Rostov on Don (Consulate-General) 
 Yekaterinburg (Consulate-General) 
 Vladivostok (Consulate-General)

 Madrid (Embassy)

 Kyiv (Embassy)

 London (Embassy)

Multilateral organisations
 
Geneva (Permanent Mission)
New York (Permanent Mission)

Gallery

See also
 Foreign relations of Uzbekistan

References

External links
 Ministry of Foreign Affairs of the Republic of Uzbekistan

 
Uzbekistan
Diplomatic missions